Yakkabogʻ District is a district of Qashqadaryo Region in Uzbekistan. The capital lies at the city Yakkabogʻ. The district consists of one city (Yakkabogʻ), 14 urban-type settlements (Eski Yakkabogʻ, Alaqargʻa, Alakoʻylak, Jarqirgʻiz, Qayragʻoch, Qatagʻon, Kattabogʻ, Madaniyat, Mevazor, Samoq, Turon, Oʻz, Chubron, Edilbek) and 9 rural communities.

References

Qashqadaryo Region
Districts of Uzbekistan